Mary Ammirato-Collins (or Mary Collins Ammirato, born April 3, 1908, date of death unknown) was an artist and poet born in Houston, Texas.

She was a student at the Académie Julian in Paris. She exhibited at the Salon des Indépendants in 1937. Mary also had a showing of her enamels on copper during a visit to the US in Philadelphia, Pennsylvania. Mary lived in the Canary Islands with husband Claudio Ammirato, who was an artist and composer, and a physicist. Both who were long time friends of heiress Eleanor Post Hutton.  Mary was a travel companion of Eleanor's and also a Ziegfeld Follies girl in New York City where she met Claudio.

Ammirato-Collins wrote the libretto for her husband's opera, Paradise Lost (A comedy for Modern Times).

Selected exhibitions
1973 – Woodstock Gallery, London (first one-woman exhibition)
1974 – Art Alliance, Philadelphia (first American exhibition)
1976 – , Spain
1976 – Provincial Palace, Zaragoza, Spain

Books 

Ammirato was the author of several books of poems, some of which were illustrated by her husband Claudio Ammirato:
The Beach at Sierra Helada (1935)
Tapestry of Sleep (1936)
Dustless Beauty (1937)
Palm Tree Daughters (1938)
Red Apples of Fall (1947)
Spring in Olympus (1939).

References

General references 

Poets from Texas
American artists
Académie Julian alumni
1908 births
Year of death missing
American women poets
People from Polk County, Texas
American expatriates in France
American expatriates in Spain
Artists from the Canary Islands
Writers from the Canary Islands